Fountain Green Hydroelectric Plant Historic District, located northwest of Fountain Green, Utah, was listed on the National Register of Historic Places in 1989.  The listing included three contributing buildings and a contributing structure.

Description
The Fountain Green Power Plant was built 1922-23 out on flat land below the foothills of the San Pitch Mountains.  Unlike hydroelectric plants powered by water from mountain streams, it used water from Big Springs, which collected behind an earthen dam and was transported by a conduit pipe to the Fountain Green powerhouse.  The powerhouse is a relatively small structure holding only two turbine units.  It has a simple architectural style containing elements of Art Moderne.  Two ancillary smaller brick buildings are close by;  in 1988 one was in use as a garage and battery house, the other as storage.  The plant is located by the intersection of Big Spring Road (or N. 500 West Street) with the driveway to the Fountain Green Fish Hatchery, on the northwest side of Fountain Green.  The power plant was decommissioned in 2014.

The  listed area of the historic district was split between two discontiguous pieces. The conduit pipe from the dam down to the power plant was deemed non-contributing, and not included in the listing.

Big Springs Electric Company; Fountain Green Hydro

"Utah Division of Wildlife Resources Fountain Green Fish Hatchery. Water leaving the powerhouse is diverted into the fish ponds. A county road from Fountain Green provides access to both the power plant site and fish hatchery. Unlike hydroelectric plants powered by water from mountain streams, the Fountain Green unit operates on water from Big Springs, a major water source about one and a half miles west of Fountain Green.
There, water pours from a canyon wall, is captured by a small,
earthen dam and diverted into a steel conduit which carries the
water to the powerhouse. The plant site is not located at the
mouth of a canyon, but lies in an open pasture some miles distant from the mountains. Although the plant site has a small front yard, there are few shade trees and landscaping details. About
one quarter mile northwest of the plant is the foundation of the
original Big Springs Electric Company hydroelectric plant. Built
in 1902, this facility also used water from Big Springs. The dam
at Big Springs may have also served this original hydroelectric
plant, although the dam was probably rebuilt in 1922 at the time
the Fountain Green facility was constructed."

Architecture: Modern Movement
Historic function: Industry/processing/extraction
Historic subfunction: Energy Facility
Criteria: event, architecture/engineering

See also

 National Register of Historic Places listings in Sanpete County, Utah

References

External links

Moderne architecture in Utah
National Register of Historic Places in Sanpete County, Utah
Buildings and structures completed in 1922